Markus Beierle (born 2 June 1972) is a German former professional footballer who played as a striker.

Career
Beierle was born in Brackenheim. His career began at TSV Cleebronn and Union Böckingen. Professional scouts became interested in his talents, and in 1992 he signed a contract with VfB Stuttgart. A year later, the qualified mechanic signed for SSV Ulm, before becoming a full club member of Stuttgarter Kickers in 1995.

In 1998 the player moved to his first top-tier squad, MSV Duisburg. After two years of great contrasts with the team he moved to subsequent Champions League qualifiers TSV 1860 Munich. Subsequent to their qualification he moved to Hansa Rostock, before moving to Eintracht Frankfurt in the winter of 2003.

Finding himself very much out of the plans of Friedhelm Funkel while they were both still very early on in their careers at the club, Beierle looked for a new footballing challenge, which he found with Bruno Labbadia at Darmstadt. As the first of Labaddia's top-name arrivals at the lilies, he was hoping for a swift rise into the top division.

References

External links
 
 

1972 births
Living people
Association football forwards
German footballers
VfB Stuttgart players
VfB Stuttgart II players
SSV Ulm 1846 players
Stuttgarter Kickers players
MSV Duisburg players
TSV 1860 Munich players
FC Hansa Rostock players
Eintracht Frankfurt players
SV Darmstadt 98 players
Bundesliga players
2. Bundesliga players